Daniel Bazán Vera (born May 5, 1973 in Buenos Aires, Argentina) is an Argentine association football forward currently playing for Gimnasia y Tiro de Salta of the Torneo Argentino A in Argentina.

Teams
  Almirante Brown 1993–1995 (53 goals)
  Club Germinal 1995–1996 (27 goals)
  Olimpo de Bahía Blanca 1996–1997 (19 goals)
  Defensa y Justicia 1997–1998  (18 goals)
  Santiago Morning 1998 (9 goals)
  Temperley 1998–1999  (21 goals)
  Olimpo de Bahía Blanca 1999–2000 (21 goals)
  Almirante Brown 2000–2001 (19 goals)
  Atlanta 2002 (15 goals)
  Almirante Brown 2002 (11 goals)
  FC Inter Turku 2002–2003 (0 goals)
  Almirante Brown 2004 (21 goals)
  Unión de Santa Fe 2004–2006 (63 goals)
  Tristán Suárez 2006–2007 (26 goals)
  Almagro 2007 (11 goals)
  Atlético Rafaela 2008 (21 goals)
  Temperley 2008–2009 (5 goals)
  Almirante Brown 2009–2011 (9 goals)
  Gimnasia y Tiro de Salta 2011–present

Personal life
Bazán Vera's nephew, Nazareno Bazán, is a professional footballer.

References

 Profile at BDFA 

1973 births
Living people
Argentine footballers
Argentine expatriate footballers
Olimpo footballers
Club Almagro players
CSyD Tristán Suárez footballers
Atlético de Rafaela footballers
Gimnasia y Tiro footballers
Unión de Santa Fe footballers
Santiago Morning footballers
Expatriate footballers in Chile
Expatriate footballers in Finland
Association football forwards
Footballers from Buenos Aires